The Bishop of Lancaster is the Ordinary of the Roman Catholic Diocese of Lancaster in the Province of Liverpool, England.

The see is in the city of Lancaster where the bishop's seat is located at the Cathedral Church of Saint Peter.

The diocese was erected on 22 November 1924. The current bishop is the Right Reverend Paul Swarbrick, the 7th Bishop of Lancaster. He succeeded Michael Campbell, O.S.A. in 2018, who was installed on 1 May 2009 and had previously been coadjutor bishop.

List of the Bishops of the Roman Catholic Diocese of Lancaster, England 
Do not confuse the first bishop of this diocese with Thomas Bernard Pearson, auxiliary bishop in this diocese from 1949 to 1983.

See also 
Roman Catholicism in England and Wales

References 

 Lancaster
Lancaster